James Hunter McMurdo (1836–1904) was a member of the Wisconsin State Assembly.

Biography
McMurdo was born on September 1, 1836 in Pennfield Parish, New Brunswick. During the American Civil War, he served with the 44th Wisconsin Volunteer Infantry Regiment of the Union Army and would take part in the Battle of Nashville. He achieved the rank of corporal. McMurdo died on August 4, 1904.

Assembly career
McMurdo was a member of the Assembly during the 1880 and 1881 sessions, succeeding his brother-in-law Francis Steffen. He was a Republican.

References

1836 births
1904 deaths
People from Charlotte County, New Brunswick
Colony of New Brunswick people
People from Outagamie County, Wisconsin
Republican Party members of the Wisconsin State Assembly
People of Wisconsin in the American Civil War
Union Army soldiers
Pre-Confederation Canadian emigrants to the United States
19th-century American politicians